Thermochrous stenocraspis is a species of moth of the Anomoeotidae family. It is found in the Democratic Republic of the Congo and Zimbabwe.

References

Anomoeotidae
Insects of the Democratic Republic of the Congo
Moths of Africa